Valentina Buliga (born 2 September 1961) is a Moldovan politician. She was the Minister of Labour, Social Protection and Family in the First Vlad Filat Cabinet and in the Second Filat Cabinet as well. Previously he was a deputy in the Parliament of the Republic of Moldova, elected in the Legislature 2005–2009 on the lists of the Democratic Moldova Electoral Bloc.

Biography 

Valentina Buliga was born on 2 September 1961 in Horeşti, Făleşti. In 1983 she graduated the State University of Medicine at the pharmacy specialty (diploma with mention), and in 2004 - the Academy of Public Administration under the President of the Republic of Moldova, a master in public administration. 

From 1983 to 1998 he was a pharmacist at the Fălești District Hospital, Fălești Rayonal Central Pharmacy. From 1998 to 2001 he was Head of Department at the Ministry of Health.

From 2001 until 2004 he was the Head of Laboratory at the National Institute of Pharmacy, and from 2004 until 2005 - Head of the Medical Insurance Department in the International Insurance Company "QBE ASITO".

In 2005 she became deputy in the Parliament of the Republic of Moldova on the 16th Legislature in the DPM parliamentary faction and chairman of the parliamentary commission for social protection, health and family.

By the Decree of the President of the Republic of Moldova no. 4-V on 25 September 2009 was appointed Minister of Labor, Social Protection and Family of the Republic of Moldova.

In the local elections in 2011 she ran for Chișinău general mayor's office, winning 2.56% or 8848 valid votes in the first round, and did not participate in round II.

Family
Valentina Buliga is married to Alexei Buliga and together they have two children (a son and a daughter).

External links 
 Government of Moldova

References
 

Living people
1961 births
People from Fălești District
Moldovan pharmacists
Moldovan MPs 2005–2009
Moldovan MPs 2009–2010
Democratic Party of Moldova MPs
Moldovan female MPs
21st-century Moldovan women politicians

Recipients of the Order of Honour (Moldova)
Women pharmacists